Munger railway station, station code MGR, is the railway station serving the Munger city in the Munger district in the Indian State of Bihar.

Background

The previous railway station was closed for making Munger Ganga Bridge and a new railway station, 2.1 kilometer southeast from old one towards Purabsarai locality, on the new broad-gauge line, has been constructed and opened on 11 April 2016. Electrification completed in year 2020.
Munger railway station is now the main rail head for Munger city after Jamalpur Junction. Munger  is part of the Malda railway division of the Eastern Railway zone of the Indian Railways.

Connectivity

Munger is connected to metropolitan areas of India like Delhi–Kolkata, Sahibganj loop and Barauni–Guwahati line also connected through recently opened Rail cum Road Munger Ganga Bridge. The station is located about  1.2 km from Munger Fort .

Platforms

There are 3 tracks with 2 platforms in Munger station. The platforms are interconnected with subway. There is space to construct 2 more platforms if needed in future. All 3 tracks are fully electrified.

See also
 Munger
 Munger District
 Jamalpur Junction railway station

References

External links

Malda railway division
Railway stations in Munger district